BIRDHSO is a Switzerland-based human rights organization campaigning against the human rights violations in Western Sahara. It has also delegations in France, Italy and Spain.

Objectives
BIRDSHO objectives according to its statutes are:
Assuring worldwide information as complete as possible about human rights violations in the framework of the Western Sahara conflict.
Denouncing to international organisms (UN, ICRC among others) every human rights violation in the region.
Assuring a permanent contact with international human rights organizations for being able to intervene at Moroccan authorities.
Sustaining morally and materially the families and victims of Forced disappearance.
Supporting by any means the work of Sahrawi human rights organizations in the occupied territories and abroad.

El Karama
Before the BIRDHSO official foundation in 2002, and after a reunion in November 1993 in Rome, the collective had been releasing every year (since 1994) 3 or 4 informative bulletins entitled "El Karama" (Arabic, والكرامة; English, The Dignity) on the human rights situation in Western Sahara.

See also 

 Human rights in Western Sahara
 History of Western Sahara
 AFAPREDESA
 ASVDH

References 

Human rights organisations based in Switzerland
Human rights in Western Sahara
Politics of Western Sahara
Political organizations based in Western Sahara